RJK or Russia-Japan-Korea is a submarine telecommunications cable system linking the three named countries bordering the Sea of Japan.  It began operation in 1995.

It has landing points in:
Nakhodka, Russia
Naoetsu, Japan
Pusan, Korea

Sources
 

Submarine communications cables in the Pacific Ocean
Russia–South Korea relations
Japan–South Korea relations
Japan–Russia relations
1995 establishments in Japan
1995 establishments in Russia
1995 establishments in South Korea